Tamika Upton (born 17 March 1997) is an Australian professional rugby league footballer who currently plays for the Newcastle Knights in the NRL Women's Premiership. She previously played for the Brisbane Broncos in the NRLW, and the Burleigh Bears in the QRL Women's Premiership.

Background
Born in Rockhampton, Upton grew up in Central Queensland and first started playing rugby league as a child in Blackwater. She is of Indigenous Australian descent.

Prior to her career as a rugby league player, Upton played touch football.  She represented the Australian national side, the Emus, during the 2017 Trans Tasman series.   She also served as co-captain of the Queensland Cowboys during the NRL Touch competition in 2017. Upton has also played netball for local Central Queensland team, the Capricorn Claws.

Playing career
In 2018, she joined the Yeppoon Seagulls' women's side, where she played in five-eighth in the Rockhampton District competition.

2019
On 15 July, Upton signed with the Brisbane Broncos NRL Women's Premiership team.

On 7 October, Upton was named in the Australian team for the 2019 World Cup 9s but withdrew and was replaced by Tarryn Aiken.

2020
In February, Upton played for the Broncos at the NRL Nines, where she was named in the Team of the Tournament. In March, Upton joined the Central Queensland Capras in the QRL Women's Premiership and later played for the Souths Logan Magpies in the Holcim Cup.

In Round 1 of the 2020 NRL Women's season, Upton scored a hat-trick in the first half for the Broncos in their win over the New Zealand Warriors at GIO Stadium.

On 13 November, Upton made her State of Origin debut for Queensland, scoring two tries in a 24–18 win over New South Wales.

2021
In 2021, Upton joined the Burleigh Bears in the QRL Women's Premiership, starting at fullback and scoring two tries in their Grand Final win over the Valleys Diehards. On 25 June, she started at fullback for Queensland in their 8–6 win over New South Wales.

On 29 June, Upton re-signed with the Broncos for the 2021 NRL Women's season.

2022
On 18 May 2022, the Newcastle Knights announced the signing of Upton and Millie Boyle ahead of the 2022 NRL Women's season. Upton made her club debut for the Knights in round 1 of the 2022 NRLW season against her former club the Brisbane Broncos.

In the 2022 Semi Final against the St. George Illawarra Dragons, Upton became the first Knights player to score more than one try in a game, when she scored two tries in the Knights' 30-6 win to qualify them for the Grand Final. Upton would be awarded the Karyn Murphy Medal when she was named player of the match in the 2022 NRL Women's Grand Final, scoring a try in the Knights' 32–12 victory over the Parramatta Eels. The victory was Upton's third premiership title.

Upton was named in the Australian squad for the 2021 Women's Rugby League World Cup, but withdrew from the squad due to injury.

References

External links
Newcastle Knights profile
NRL profile

1997 births
Living people
Indigenous Australian rugby league players
Australian female rugby league players
Brisbane Broncos (NRLW) players
Newcastle Knights (NRLW) players
Rugby league fullbacks